The Piazza may refer to:

John Mackintosh Square in Gibraltar
The first story in Melville's The Piazza Tales

See also
Piazza (disambiguation)